Women's Honor is a 1913 American silent short drama film directed by Alan Dwan starring Charlotte Burton, Louise Lester, J. Warren Kerrigan, and Jack Richardson.

External links

1913 films
1913 drama films
Silent American drama films
American silent short films
American black-and-white films
1913 short films
Films directed by Allan Dwan
1910s American films
1910s English-language films
American drama short films